Pentland is a rural town and locality in the Charters Towers Region, Queensland, Australia.

Geography 
Pentland is located between Charters Towers and Hughenden.

In the east, a small section of the Campaspe River flows through Pentland. White Mountains National Park has been established in the north. The Cape River rises in the area. In the south is the salt lake known as Lake Buchanan.

The Flinders Highway passes through Pentland (both town and locality) from east to west, as does the Great Northern railway line. The locality is served by the following railway stations (from west to east):

 Burra railway station
 Warrigal railway station
 Pentland railway station, serving the town
 Cape River railway station, now abandoned
 Kimburra railway station, now abandoned

The former town of Capeville on the Cape River is within the locality of Pentland approximately 10 km NNW of the town of Pentland.

Within the town, the Flinders Highway is also known as Main Street.

History

The Cape River goldfields opened in July 1867 on the advice of geologist Richard Daintree. By 1870 there were over 20,000 men working the goldfield but by 1873, the population of Capeville had reduced to about 30.

There was a telegraph office from 1880 to 1884.

Bett's Creek Post Office opened on 7 October 1884. It was renamed Pentland in 1885.

The Great Northern Railway opened to Pentland  on 6 October 1884. 

Pentland Provisional School opened on 11 May 1885. On 1 January 1909, it became Pentland State School.

Oakvale Provisional School opened in 1902 and closed in 1907.

The Soldiers Memorial Hall was opened on Saturday 24 April 1926 by Mrs Lydia Pilcher, who had four sons in the military in World War I, one of whom, Ernest Sydney Pilcher, died of wounds in 1918.

Cape River State School opened on 25 October 1915 and closed in 1938.

Pentland Meatworks (also known as Cape River Meatworks) was opened in 1943 to meet the additional needs of Australian and American forces arriving in North Queensland during World War II. The end of the war in 1945 meant the army no longer had a need for the facility, after which it had a number of changes of ownership. The meatworks saw the township of Pentland thrive.  The meatworks eventually closed in September 1989.

In 1964, St Mary's Catholic Church opened in Pentland. It was relocated from Sellheim where it was built in 1906.

In the early 1970s, there were two grocery stores and the Pentland State School had around 70 enrolled students, the town pool was opened and the town's only hotel, the Pentland Hotel Motel was renovated.

In 2009, the locality of Pentland was expanded to include the discontinued localities of The Cape, Buchanan and Torrens Creek.

The 2013 Australian Federal Government budget included funds for a feasibility study on "the potential to develop land for sugarcane production, milling, ethanol and cogeneration infrastructure in the Pentland region."

On Wednesday 25 April (Anzac Day) 2018, a war memorial was officially opened at the Soldiers Memorial Hall as part of  the Centenary of World War I. The memorial commemorates all who have served and died in Australia's military forces.

Education 
Pentland State School is a government primary (Early Childhood-6) school for boys and girls at Gilmore Street. In 2018, the school had an enrolment of 23 students with 3 teachers (2 full-time equivalent) and 5 non-teaching staff (3 full-time equivalent).

There is no secondary school in Pentland or nearby. Distance education and boarding schools are options.

Amenities 
Pentland Soldiers Memorial Hall is at 2 Gilmore Street. There is a small war memorial at the front of the building where the annual Anzac Day ceremony is held.

There are two churches in Pentland:

 St Aidan's Anglican Church, 21 Mill Street
 St Mary's Catholic Church, 64 Main Street (corner of Hunt Street)

Attractions 
Pentland's history is presented at Pentland Hotel at 32 Main Street. It also provides meals and accommodation.

In the west of the locality where the highway passes over the Great Dividing Range is the Burra Range Lookout, on the Flinders Highway at the Burra Range Rest Area in the White Mountains National Park.

Transport 
Queensland Rail's Inlander service between Townsville and Mount Isa provides a twice-weekly service which can be booked to stop at Pentland and Torrens Creek.

References

Further reading

External links 

 

Charters Towers Region
Localities in Queensland
Mining towns in Queensland